The Ssangbangwool Raiders were a South Korean professional baseball team founded in 1990 and dissolved upon bankruptcy of the team's owner after the 1999 season. They were based in the North Jeolla Province and were members of the Korea Baseball Organization. They made the playoffs twice in their nine-year KBO history, losing both times, never making it to the Korean Series.

The two most notable players who spent considerable time with the Raiders were designated hitter Kim Ki-tai, who won a home run title in 1994 and a batting title in 1997 (as well as being a three-time KBO League Golden Glove Award winner with the Raiders), and Park Kyung-oan, considered by many to be one of the best catchers in Korean baseball history.

History 
The Raiders played the 1990 season in the KBO Futures League, South Korea's second level of baseball. The team joined the KBO League in 1991.

On April 30, 1993, Raiders pitcher Kim Won-hyeong threw a no-hitter, defeating the OB Bears 3–0 at Jeonju Baseball Stadium. At the age of 20, Kim was the youngest KBO pitcher to ever throw a no-hitter.

Ssangbangwool suffered through a 17-game losing streak in 1999 on their way to a record of 28–97–7 and a winning percentage of .224, one of the worst seasons in KBO history. The Raiders were dissolved after the season because of the bankruptcy of the Ssangbangwool Group, the team's owner. The franchise was subsumed by the KBO, which then awarded a new franchise to the SK conglomerate. The new franchise was named the SK Wyverns and was formed in 2000.

Season-by-season records

References 

KBO League teams
Baseball teams established in 1990
Baseball teams disestablished in 2000
Sport in North Jeolla Province
1990 establishments in South Korea
2000 disestablishments in South Korea
History of baseball in South Korea